John Elvis Harlin II (June 30, 1935 – March 22, 1966) was an American mountaineer and US Air Force pilot who was killed while making an ascent of the north face of the Eiger.

Biography 
Harlin graduated from Sequoia High School and Stanford University. 

Having established himself as a top-rank mountaineer with the first American ascent of the Eiger North Face's Original Route in 1962 and the American Direct on the Dru, he conceived of climbing the Eiger by the direttissima (Italian for "most direct") route. Two thousand feet from the summit, his rope broke and he fell to his death in 1966. The Scottish mountaineer Dougal Haston, who had been climbing with Harlin, reached the summit with a German party which joined forces to follow the same route, afterwards named the "Harlin route" in his honor. The story of the climb was recounted in the book Direttissima: The Eiger Assault by British author (and ground team member) Peter Gillman and Dougal Haston.
In 1965 Harlin had founded the "International School of Modern Mountaineering" in Leysin, Switzerland (the word "Modern" was later dropped from the title.) Harlin had previously worked as sports director at the Leysin American School.

Harlin's son, John Harlin III, who was nine at the time of his father's death, is also a mountaineer and was the editor-in-chief of the American Alpine Club's American Alpine Journal.  Harlin III, himself an accomplished climber and author of five books, recently climbed the Eiger by the "original" route. He has written a book about his experience entitled The Eiger Obsession. A film of the son's climb to exorcise the ghosts left by his father's death came out in May 2007: The Alps by Steve Judson and his Academy Award-nominated film team, is an Imax movie containing footage of the north face of the Eiger as well as other Alpine peaks. Harlin III returned to the Leysin American School where his father was sports director, as the director of the Alpine Institute.

First ascents 
 1964 Cime de l'Est NE ridge, Dents du Midi, Valais, Switzerland. With Chris Bonington and Rusty Baillie
 1965 American Direttissima, Aiguille du Dru, Mont Blanc Range, France.  With Royal Robbins.

Bibliography 
 Salter, James. Solo Faces, Collins, 1980
 Ullman, James Ramsay. Straight Up: The Life and Death of John Harlin, Doubleday, 1968
 Harlin, John. The Eiger Obsession: Facing the mountain that killed my father, Simon & Schuster, 2007; Lyons Press 2009
 Fenoli, Marc. « Leysin, le roc des sixties », in Montagnes Magazine, no 158, April 1993 : illustrated dossier on the International school of modern mountaineering in Leysin, Switzerland, and the ascent of the Eiger in 1966 by John Harlin, Dougal Haston, Don Williams.

References

External links
Film clip from Eiger: Tragedy and Triumph. Accessed 15 December 2012.

1935 births
1966 deaths
American mountain climbers
Mountaineering deaths
Sport deaths in Switzerland
Place of birth missing
People from Redwood City, California